Victrix tabora is a moth of the family Noctuidae. It is found in the south-eastern part of the Taurus mountains in Turkey, the mountains of northern Iraq and western Iran and the Judean mountains in Israel.

Adults are on wing in autumn. There is one generation per year.

External links
The Acronictinae, Bryophilinae, Hypenodinae and Hypeninae of Israel

Acronictinae
Moths of the Middle East
Moths described in 1892